Tajik Air (legally State Unitary Aviation Enterprise) (Cyrillic: Таджик Эйр) is an airline in Tajikistan. It has its head office at Dushanbe International Airport in Dushanbe. The airline's main hub is at Dushanbe International Airport; in the past, it had also retained a secondary focus city at Khujand's Khudzhand Airport.

History

The first flight of the airline was from Bukhara to Dushanbe on 3 September 1924 by a Junkers F.13 aircraft, initiating the development of civil aviation in Tajikistan. The first aircraft appeared in the capital two years earlier than the car and five years earlier than the train. The Stalinabad airfield complex was created and the operation of new routes started over the Pamir mountain ranges. In 1930, a first-class airport was built in Dushanbe. One year later airports were built in Kulyab, Garm, Panj, and Dangara where regular flights were operated from Dushanbe. Aviation of Tajikistan developed rapidly as the air fleet expanded. Air transport became an essential branch of the country's national economy. Tajik aviation provided regular connections between the capital and the highland settlements in the hard-to-reach valleys of Vanch, Rushan, Shugnan, Bartang, Yagnob, and others, reducing the travel time of passengers of the mountain regions of the Pamirs, Karategin, blooming valleys of Vakhsh, Hissar by tens or hundreds of times. In March 1937, the Tajik Territorial Department of Civil Air Fleet was formed. 

In 1945, the Tajik Department of Civil Air Fleet (TU GVF) received new Lisunov Li-2 and Junkers Ju 52 aircraft. The first flight by the crew of the Li-2 aircraft was operated on the route Stalinabad – Moscow. In the 1950s and 1960s, aviation in Tajikistan was one of the most developed sectors of the national economy of the Republic. From 1951, Antonov An-2s were utilized in the fleet of the Tajik Department of Civil Air Fleet and in 1954 Ilyushin Il-12s were introduced, by which the first flight on the route Stalinabad – Sochi was operated. Between 1956 and 1964, Ilyushin Il-14, Ilyushin Il-18 and Antonov An-6 (high-altitude version of the An-2) aircraft joined the fleet, as well as Mil Mi-4 helicopters.Aviators of Tajikistan were always in the front line of development of the socio-economic potential of the country. For the first time in 1959,  B.M. Vorobiev landed an aircraft (an An-6) on the ice of the Sarez Lake. In 1960, the first flight on the route Stalinabad – Moscow was operated by an Ilyushin Il-18. The TU GVF's structure was expanded and developed. 

In 1959, the Leninabad aviation enterprise was founded and, in a year, the Kulyab airport was established. On March 3, 1960, the passenger terminal and runway were put into operation. The route Stalinabad – Frunze – Alma-Ata – Novosibirsk was opened. In the 1970s and '80s pilots and navigators of the Tajikistan Civil Aviation Authority mastered such aircraft as the Tupolev Tu-154, Yakovlev Yak-40, Antonov An-26 and Antonov An-28. In 1979 the first flight to Afghanistan was operated by an Il-18 aircraft on a humanitarian mission. In 1984 the automatic reservation system "Sirena" for booking seats on the domestic airlines was introduced. In 4 years, the Tajik Civil Aviation Authority changed over to the new conditions of management and planning.

Judging by the efficiency of the Yak-40 and An-28 aircraft utilization, the Tajik Civil Aviation Authority won first place in the USSR's Air Fleet. In the 1990 -1991 period, the aircraft-helicopter fleet of the aviation enterprise was expanded with Ilyushin Il-76 and Tupolev Tu-154M aircraft; and Mil Mi-8 helicopters. Central Asia's first "Zardak" transponder was built and air service on the route Dushanbe-Ürümqi was opened. 

On 14 January 2019, Tajik Air suspended all operations until November 2019. The airline has since restarted operations.

Destinations
Tajik Air serves the following destinations as of November 2019:

Fleet

Current fleet
As of February 2023, the Fleet of Tajik Air consisted of the following aircraft:

Former fleet
Tajik Air had in the past operated a variety of aircraft:

 Antonov An-24
 Antonov An-26
 Boeing 737-200
 Boeing 737-300
 Boeing 737-400
 Boeing 737-500
 Boeing 737-800
 Boeing 747SP
 Boeing 767-300
 Bombardier CRJ200
 Junkers F.13
 Junkers Ju 52
 Lisunov Li-2
 Mil Mi-8
 Tupolev Tu-134A
 Tupolev Tu-154B
 Tupolev Tu-154M
 Xian MA60
 Yakovlev Yak-40

Accidents and incidents
 On June 17, 1993, an Antonov An-26 crashed during the flight from Batumi, Georgia to Baku, Azerbaijan after it got into turbulence. All 33 people on board died.

 On August 28, 1993, a Yakovlev Yak-40 crashed on take-off in Khorugh while on a flight to Dushanbe. All 5 crew members and 77 of the 81 passengers died. The aircraft was configured to carry 28 passengers but was severely overloaded. The crew had been forced to take off by armed men.

 On December 15, 1997, Tajikistan Airlines Flight 3183, a Tupolev Tu-154B crashed at Sharjah in the United Arab Emirates, due to the landing approach being too low. Of the 86 people on board, only one survived, Sergei Petrov.

References

External links

 
  
  
 Official Website (Archive: 2003–2007)

Airlines of Tajikistan
Airlines established in 1924
Former Aeroflot divisions
1924 establishments in the Soviet Union